Henry Fisk Janes (October 10, 1792 –  June 6, 1879) was an American lawyer and politician. He served as a U.S. Representative from Vermont.

Biography
Janes was born in Brimfield, Massachusetts and moved with his parents to Calais, Vermont where he pursued academic studies.  He served in the War of 1812 as an officer in Captain Gideon Wheelock's company of Vermont Militia, and participated in the Battle of Plattsburgh.

He studied law in Montpelier and was admitted to the bar. He began the practice of law in Waterbury. He was Postmaster from 1820 until 1830. He served as a member of the Governor's Council from 1830 until 1834.

Janes was elected as an Anti-Masonic candidate to the Twenty-third Congress to fill the vacancy caused by the death of Benjamin F. Deming and was reelected to the Twenty-fourth Congress, serving from December 2, 1834, until March 3, 1837. He was an unsuccessful Anti-Masonic candidate for reelection in 1836.

He was the Vermont State Treasurer from 1838 until 1841 as a Whig, and served as a member of the state council of censors in 1848. Janes joined the Republican Party at its creation in the mid-1850s, and was a member of the Vermont House of Representatives in 1854, 1855, 1861, and 1862.

Personal life
In 1827 Janes married Fanny Butler, the daughter of Governor Ezra Butler. Their daughter Helen Maria was born in 1828, and their son Henry Janes was born in 1832 and died in 1915.  Henry Janes was a physician during the American Civil War, and attained the rank of brigadier general as surgeon general of the Vermont National Guard.

Death
Janes died on June 6, 1879, in Waterbury, Vermont, and is interred at Hope Cemetery in Waterbury.

References

External links
 
 Biographical Directory of the United States Congress
 
 Govtrack.us
 The Political Graveyard
 Our Campaigns

1792 births
1879 deaths
People from Brimfield, Massachusetts
Anti-Masonic Party politicians from Vermont
Anti-Masonic Party members of the United States House of Representatives from Vermont
Members of the Vermont House of Representatives
State treasurers of Vermont
Vermont lawyers
American militia officers
American militiamen in the War of 1812
People from Calais, Vermont
19th-century American lawyers
Military personnel from Massachusetts
Members of the United States House of Representatives from Vermont